Nakano Dam (Pre)  is a gravity dam located in Hokkaido Prefecture in Japan. The dam is used for water supply. The catchment area of the dam is 17.5 km2. The dam impounds about 8  ha of land when full and can store 764 thousand cubic meters of water. The construction of the dam was started on 1956 and completed in 1960.

References

Dams in Hokkaido